Feng Weihua, born March 1948, is a Red Notice fugitive convicted of bribery and embezzlement. His illegal gains were confiscated on February, 2023.

Background 
Between 2003 and 2009, Feng held various positions in Shanghai. He abused his power to embezzle 86 million yuan, take bribes worth 36.33 million yuan, and take more than 17.91 million yuan in public funds from Xinyang industrial park. He then used these misappropriated funds to purchase a 32,667-square-meter plot in Baoshan District, Shanghai, with factory buildings and rent worth 47 million yuan ($6.8 million).

On July 22, 2012, Feng fled overseas to Canada.

On February 24, 2023, the Shanghai No. 2 Intermediate People's Court ordered the confiscation of Feng Weihua's illegal gains, including all the land and factories in Baoshan.

References 

1948 births
Living people